For the Summer Olympics, there are 31 venues that have been or will be used for fencing.

References

Venues
 
Fen